All Is Well may refer to:

 All Is Well (2011 film), a 2011 film by Angolan filmmaker Pocas Pascoal
 All Is Well (2015 film), a 2015 Bollywood film
 All Is Well (2018 film), a 2018 German film
 All Is Well (album), a 2008 album by Sam Amidon
 "All Is Well" (hymn) or "Come, Come, Ye Saints", an 1846 Mormon hymn by William Clayton
 "All Is Well", a song by Chicago from Chicago V
 "All Is Well", a song by Katey Sagal from Well...
 "All Is Well", a song by Michael W. Smith from Christmas
 "All Is Well", a song by Soul Asylum from The Silver Lining
 All Is Well, a 1955 film starring Toshiro Mifune
All's Well That Ends Well, a Shakespearean comedy 
 All Is Well (TV series), a 2019 Chinese drama television series.
 All Is Well, a 2019 Singaporean-Taiwanese television series produced by Mediacorp and Taiwan Television.

See also 
 "All's Well", a 1941 Gabby cartoon by Fleischer Studios
 "Aal Izz Well", a song from the soundtrack of the film 3 Idiots
 "All's Well", a short story by P. G. Wodehouse collected in The Inimitable Jeeves
 All Is Not Well, a 1996 album by Tura Satana
 All's Well, Ends Well, a 1992 Hong Kong film, followed by several sequels
 All's Well That Ends Well (disambiguation)